Sekkemo Church is a parish church of the Church of Norway in Kvænangen Municipality in Troms og Finnmark county, Norway. It is located in the village of Sekkemo. It is one of the churches for the Kvænangen parish which is part of the Nord-Troms prosti (deanery) in the Diocese of Nord-Hålogaland. The white, wooden church was built in a long church style in 1956 using plans drawn up by the architect Olaug Kaasen. The church seats about 330 people.

History
The first church in Sekkemo was built in 1956 to replace the historic Skorpa Church as the main church for the municipality since Skorpa Church was on the island of Skorpa in the middle of the Kvænangen fjord and the majority of the population lived on the mainland. This new church was much more accessible to the people. The new church was consecrated on 16 September 1956 by the Bishop Alf Wiig.

See also
List of churches in Nord-Hålogaland

References

Kvænangen
Churches in Troms
Wooden churches in Norway
20th-century Church of Norway church buildings
Churches completed in 1956
1956 establishments in Norway
Long churches in Norway